This is a list of fossiliferous stratigraphic units in Montenegro.



List of fossiliferous stratigraphic units

See also 
 Lists of fossiliferous stratigraphic units in Europe
 List of fossiliferous stratigraphic units in Albania
 List of fossiliferous stratigraphic units in Bosnia and Herzegovina
 List of fossiliferous stratigraphic units in Croatia
 List of fossiliferous stratigraphic units in Italy
 List of fossiliferous stratigraphic units in Serbia

References

Bibliography 
 
 
 

 Montenegro
 
 
Fossiliferous stratigraphic units